is the 40th single by the Japanese idol girl group AKB48. It was released in Japan on May 20, 2015. AKB48's Chinese sister group, AKB48 Team SH, made their own Chinese version of the song.

Background 
Haruka Shimazaki serves as choreography center of this single's title song. It is also the last AKB48 single featuring members Rina Kawaei, SKE48 member Rena Matsui, and Nogizaka46 member Rina Ikoma, both two members (except Ikoma, who was a concurrent member of AKB48 and cancelled her concurrency after AKB48 Spring Shuffle will took effect) left the AKB48 group after the release of this single. Despite being the last single whom she appeared in, Kawaei is still featured in their next single Halloween Night (song), but in the coupling song “Yankee Machine Gun” as a graduated member.

Release 
The single was released in several versions: Type A (two editions: limited and regular), Type B (limited and regular), Type C (limited and regular), Type D (limited and regular), and a version called the "Theater Edition". All versions, except the Theater Edition, include a DVD with several music videos.

The first presses of the single came with a ticket to vote in the AKB48 41st Single Senbatsu Election (to choose the members to be featured in the next AKB48's single, to be released in the summer.)

Music video 
The music video for the title track was directed by Keishi Ōtomo, best known as the director of the Ruroni Kenshin movie series. Unlike other Summer-themed AKB48 singles, this single's MV does not have a paradise scenery and girls in bathing suits. Instead, they focused more on action and most complex choreography that had been set aside in "Kibōteki Refrain".

Reception 
The single debuted at number one on Oricon's daily singles chart for the day of May 19, 2015, with sales of 1,472,375 copies. It also topped the weekly Oricon Singles Chart on the June 1 week, selling 1,673,211 copies. It also reached number one on the Billboard Japan Hot 100.

Track listings

Type A

Type B

Type C

Type D

Theater Edition

Members

"Bokutachi wa Tatakawanai" 
The sembatsu (member selection) for the song consists of 32 members. The center is Haruka Shimazaki.
 AKB48 Team A: Nana Owada, Rina Kawaei, Haruna Kojima, Haruka Shimazaki, Minami Takahashi, Yui Yokoyama
 AKB48 Team K: Yuka Tano, Minami Minegishi, Mion Mukaichi, Tomu Muto
 AKB48 Team B: Ryoka Oshima, Yuki Kashiwagi, Rena Kato, Yuria Kizaki, Mayu Watanabe
 AKB48 Team 4: Nana Okada, Saya Kawamoto, Mako Kojima, Juri Takahashi
 AKB48 Team 8: Ikumi Nakano, Nagisa Sakaguchi
 SKE48 Team S: Ryoha Kitagawa, Jurina Matsui
 SKE48 Team E: Akari Suda, Rena Matsui
 NMB48 Team N: Sayaka Yamamoto
 NMB48 Team BII: Miyuki Watanabe
 HKT48 Team H: Haruka Kodama, Rino Sashihara
 HKT48 Team KIV: Sakura Miyawaki
 SNH48 Team SII: Sae Miyazawa
 Nogizaka46: Rina Ikoma

"Summer Side" 
The song is performed by a unit called Selection 16, consisting of 16 members, who sang in the title track, but didn’t appear in the music video.
 AKB48 Team A: Nana Owada
 AKB48 Team K: Yuka Tano, Minami Minegishi, Tomu Muto
 AKB48 Team B: Ryoka Oshima
 AKB48 Team 4: Nana Okada, Saya Kawamoto, Mako Kojima, Juri Takahashi
 AKB48 Team 8: Ikumi Nakano, Nagisa Sakaguchi
 SKE48 Team S: Ryoha Kitagawa
 SKE48 Team E: Akari Suda
 NMB48 Team BII: Miyuki Watanabe
 HKT48 Team H: Haruka Kodama
 SNH48 Team SII: Sae Miyazawa

"Barebare Bushi" 
The song is performed by a unit called , consisting of 5 members.
 AKB48 Team A: Haruka Shimazaki, Minami Takahashi, Yui Yokoyama
 AKB48 Team B: Yuki Kashiwagi, Mayu Watanabe

"'Danshi' wa Kenkyū Taishō" 
The song is performed by a unit called , consisting of 7 members.
 AKB48 Team 4: Nana Okada, Mako Kojima, Miki Nishino
 SKE48 Team S: Ryoha Kitagawa
 NMB48 Team BII: Nagisa Shibuya
 HKT48 Team H: Meru Tashima
 HKT48 Team KIV: Mio Tomonaga

"Kafka to Dendenmu Chu!" 
The song is performed by a unit called , consisting of 7 members.
 AKB48 Team A: Nana Owada, Megu Taniguchi
 AKB48 Team K: Mion Mukaichi
 AKB48 Team 4: Yuiri Murayama, Saya Kawamoto
 HKT48 Team H: Nako Yabuki, Miku Tanaka

"Kegarete Iru Shinjitsu" 
 AKB48 Team 8: Nagisa Sakaguchi, Yui Yokoyama, Hijiri Tanikawa, Nanami Sato, Hitomi Honda, Yuri Yokomichi, Serika Nagano, Nanami Yamada, Ikumi Nakano, Narumi Kuranoo

"Kimi no Dai Ni Shō" 
It is Rina Kawaei's graduation song.
 AKB48 Team A: Rina Kawaei, Anna Iriyama, Haruna Kojima, Haruka Shimazaki, Minami Takahashi, Yui Yokoyama
 AKB48 Team B: Yuki Kashiwagi, Yuria Kizaki, Mayu Watanabe
 AKB48 Team 4: Juri Takahashi
 SKE48 Team S: Jurina Matsui
 NMB48 Team N: Sayaka Yamamoto
 HKT48 Team H: Rino Sashihara

"Deai no Hi, Wakare no Hi" 
The song performed by the duet .
 AKB48 Team A: Minami Takahashi, Yui Yokoyama

Charts

Release history

References 

AKB48 songs
2015 songs
2015 singles
Songs with lyrics by Yasushi Akimoto
King Records (Japan) singles
Oricon Weekly number-one singles
Billboard Japan Hot 100 number-one singles